Tvarožná may refer to several places.

Tvarožná, Kežmarok District, Slovakia
Tvarožná, Brno-Country District, Czech Republic